In Greek mythology, Anchiale or Ankhiale (Ancient Greek: Ἀγχιάλη) was the name of the following personages:
 Anchiale, said to have founded the town of Anchiale near Tarsus in Cilicia. Her father was named Iapetus, and she had a son named Cydnus.
 Anchiale, a Cretan nymph, who gave birth to the metalworking Idaean Dactyls in the Dictaean cave. She was also seen as a Titan goddess and perhaps represented the warmth of fire. She was the wife of Hecaterus.
 Anchiale, according to Servius, was the mother of Oaxes by Apollo.

Notes

References 
 Apollonius of Rhodes, Apollonius Rhodius: the Argonautica, translated by Robert Cooper Seaton, W. Heinemann, 1912. Internet Archive.
Apollonius Rhodius, Argonautica translated by Robert Cooper Seaton (1853-1915), R. C. Loeb Classical Library Volume 001. London, William Heinemann Ltd, 1912. Online version at the Topos Text Project.
Apollonius Rhodius, Argonautica. George W. Mooney. London. Longmans, Green. 1912. Greek text available at the Perseus Digital Library.
 Smith, William; Dictionary of Greek and Roman Biography and Mythology, London (1873).
Stephanus of Byzantium, Stephani Byzantii Ethnicorum quae supersunt, edited by August Meineike (1790-1870), published 1849. A few entries from this important ancient handbook of place names have been translated by Brady Kiesling. Online version at the Topos Text Project.
Strabo, The Geography of Strabo. Edition by H.L. Jones. Cambridge, Mass.: Harvard University Press; London: William Heinemann, Ltd. 1924. Online version at the Perseus Digital Library.
Strabo, Geographica edited by A. Meineke. Leipzig: Teubner. 1877. Greek text available at the Perseus Digital Library.

Nymphs
Women of Apollo
Cretan characters in Greek mythology